Italian actress Irene Aloisi, was known for her performances in  (1957), Le inchieste del commissario Maigret (1964), and Le tue mani sul mio corpo (1970).  During her career, she worked in cinema, television, radio, and theatre.

Filmography

Cinema

Television

Radio

Theatre

References

External links 
 

Italian filmographies
Women in film